Hypolycaena shirozui is a butterfly of the family Lycaenidae. It was described as Chliaria shirozui and moved to Hypolycaena by Hisakazu Hayashi, 1984. It is found on Mindanao, Leyte and Samar islands in the Philippines.

References
Hayashi Hisakazu, 1981: New Lycaenid Butterflies from the Philippines 
Hayashi Hisakazu, 1984: New Synonyms, New Status, New Combinations, New Species and New Subspecies of Butterflies from the Philippines and Indonesia (Lepidoptera: Satyridae, Riodinidae, Lycaenidae), IWASE, 2: 9-34.
Treadaway, Colin G. & Schröder, Heinz G., 2012: Revised checklist of the butterflies of the Philippine Islands (Lepidoptera: Rhopalocera). Nachrichten des Entomologischen Vereins Apollo, Suppl. 20: 1-64.

Butterflies described in 1981
Hypolycaenini